The 2012 Cheltenham Council election took place on 3 May 2012 to elect members of Cheltenham Borough Council in Gloucestershire, England. Half of the council was up for election and the Liberal Democrats stayed in overall control of the council.

After the election, the composition of the council was
Liberal Democrat 25
Conservative 11
People Against Bureaucracy 4

Election result
The result of the election saw the Liberal Democrats retain control of the council with no change in the number of seats they held. The Conservatives lost one seat whilst the People Against Bureaucracy group gained one.

Ward results

Heather McLain was a sitting councillor for Park.

Duncan Smith was a sitting councillor for Charlton Kings.

Klara Sudbury was a sitting councillor for Charlton Park.

Note: due to an error by the poll clerk at St Christopher's Church polling station in Warden Hill, where voters' unique numbers were written on the reverse of ballot papers, 412 votes had to be discounted by the returning officer. Had these votes changed the result of the election, it would have to have been re-run. As it was, these votes would not have changed which candidate was elected.

References

2012 English local elections
2012
2010s in Gloucestershire